Michael Leedham (born 22 February 1950) is an Australian former cricketer. He played three first-class matches for Tasmania between 1973 and 1982.

See also
 List of Tasmanian representative cricketers

References

External links
 

1950 births
Living people
Australian cricketers
Tasmania cricketers
Cricketers from Tasmania